Atherigona is a genus of flies in the family Muscidae.

Pests
Larvae of some Atherigona species are important pests in cultivation of cereals, like rice and maize. Many are known as shoot flies. Some important species include:

Atherigona approximata (pearl millet shoot fly): affects Pennisetum typhoides, Sorghum bicolor
Atherigona atripalpis (foxtail millet shoot fly): affects Setaria italica
Atherigona biseta: affects Setaria italica, Setaria viridis
Atherigona falcata (barnyard millet shoot fly): affects Echinochloa colona, Echinochloa frumentacea, Echinochloa stagnina, Panicum sumatrense
Atherigona hyalinipennis (teff shoot fly)
Atherigona miliaceae (finger millet shoot fly or little millet shoot fly): affects Panicum miliaceum, Panicum sumatrense
Atherigona naqvii (wheat stem fly): affects Triticum aestivum, Zea mays
Atherigona orientalis (tomato fly or pepper fruit fly)
Atherigona oryzae (rice shoot fly): affects Oryza sativa, Paspalum scrobiculatum, Triticum aestivum, Zea mays
Atherigona pulla (proso millet shoot fly): affects Panicum miliaceum, Panicum sumatrense, Paspalum scrobiculatum, Setaria italica
Atherigona punctata (Coimbatore wheat stem fly): affects Triticum aestivum
Atherigona reversura (bermudagrass stem maggot): affects Cynodon dactylon (turf grasses)
Atherigona simplex (kodo millet shoot fly): affects Paspalum scrobiculatum
Atherigona soccata (sorghum shoot fly): affects Sorghum bicolor, Zea mays, Eleusine coracana

Species

See also
List of dipterans of Sri Lanka

References

Muscidae
Insect pests of millets
Taxa named by Camillo Rondani